Manhattan is an unincorporated community in central Washington Township, Putnam County, in the U.S. state of Indiana.

History
Manhattan was laid out in 1829 when the National Road was extended to that point. The community was named after Manhattan, in New York. A post office was established at Manhattan in 1830, and remained in operation until it was discontinued in 1905.

Geography
Manhattan lies on U.S. Route 40, approximately six miles southwest of the city of Greencastle.

References

Unincorporated communities in Putnam County, Indiana
Unincorporated communities in Indiana